The 2019 Aztorin German FIM Speedway Grand Prix was the seventh race of the 2019 Speedway Grand Prix season. It took place on August 31st at the Bergring Arena in Teterow, Germany.

Riders 
First reserve Robert Lambert replaced Greg Hancock. The Speedway Grand Prix Commission nominated Martin Smolinski as the wild card, and Kai Huckenbeck and Max Dilger both as Track Reserves.

Results 
The Grand Prix was won by Maciej Janowski, who beat Bartosz Zmarzlik, Matej Žagar and Niels-Kristian Iversen in the final. It was the sixth Grand Prix win of Janowski's career.

Zmarzlik's second place finish saw him move to joint-top of the overall standings with Leon Madsen on 85 points (see intermediate classification table below). Madsen, who had a six-point lead heading into the Grand Prix, was eliminated in the semi-finals.

Heat details

Intermediate classification

References

See also 

2019
Germany
Speedway competitions in Germany
2019 in German motorsport
Speedway